The 2001–02 Georgia Bulldogs basketball team represented the University of Georgia as a member of the Southeastern Conference during the 2001–02 NCAA men's basketball season. The team was led by head coach Jim Harrick, and played their home games at Stegeman Coliseum in Athens, Georgia. The Bulldogs finished atop the SEC East standings during the regular season, were bounced early from the SEC tournament, and received an at-large bid to the NCAA tournament as No. 3 seed in the East region. Georgia reached the second round by defeating No. 14 seed , 85–68, but were upset by No. 11 seed Southern Illinois, 77–75, and finished the season at 22–10 (10–6 SEC).

Roster

Schedule and results

|-
!colspan=9 style=| Regular season

|-
!colspan=9 style=| SEC Tournament

|-
!colspan=9 style=| NCAA Tournament

Rankings

References

Georgia Bulldogs basketball seasons
Georgia
Georgia
Georgia Bulldogs
Georgia Bulldogs